= Midwest Emmy Awards =

Midwest Emmy Awards may refer to the following regional Emmys:

- The Chicago / Midwest Emmy Awards, parts of Illinois, Indiana and Wisconsin
- The Upper Midwest Emmy Awards, encompassing Minnesota, North Dakota, South Dakota; and parts of Nebraska and Wisconsin
